Dizran (also known as Deh Zarūn, Dīzān, and Dizroon) is a village in Kahduiyeh Rural District, Nir District, Taft County, Yazd Province, Iran. At the 2006 census, its population was 264, in 73 families.

References 

Populated places in Taft County